"Under" is a song by English singer-songwriter Alex Hepburn. It was released on May 17, 2013 as the lead single from her debut album, Together Alone.

Track listing

Charts

Weekly charts

Year-end charts

Certifications

References

External links

2012 songs